Namitha Pramod (born 19 September 1996) is an Indian actress who appears mainly in Malayalam films She made her acting debut in the Malayalam film Puthiya Theerangal.

She went on to appear in super hit films like Puthiya Theerangal (2012),Sound thoma (2013), Pullipulikalum Aattinkuttiyum (2013), Vikramadithyan (2014), Villali Veeran (2014), Chandrettan Evideya (2015), Amar Akbar Anthony (2015), Adi Kapyare Kootamani (2015), Role Models (2017) & Al Mallu (2020).

Early life and education
Namitha Pramod was born in Kottayam  as the daughter of Pramod, a businessman and Indu, a housewife. Her younger sister is Akhita Pramod. She attended Carmel Girls Higher Secondary School in Thiruvananthapuram. She attended the St. Teresa's College, Kochi to pursue a Bachelor of Arts degree in Sociology. She has stated that she was "not going to let [her] acting career compromise [her] studies".

Career
Namitha started acting when she was in seventh standard by acting in Vellankanni Mathavu, Amme Devi, and Ente Manasa Puthri. She made her debut in Rajesh Pillai's critically acclaimed Traffic. In her next film Puthiya Theerangal she played her first lead role, playing a fisherwoman, opposite Nivin Pauly. It was followed by more lead roles in Sound Thoma with Dileep and Pullipulikalum Aattinkuttiyum with Kunchacko Boban in which she played a Mohiniyattam dancer. She was not trained in Mohiniyattam and learned the dance steps in Saranya Mohan's dance school in Alappuzha for four days. Both films were successful and she was selected as Top Star (Female) 2013 in Malayalam.

In 2014, she was first seen in En Kadhal Pudhithu, her debut Tamil film directed by Maaris Kumar which had a delayed release, followed by Lijin Jose's Law Point in which she played a modern, city bred girl named Maya. In Lal Jose's Vikramadithyan, she played the role of Deepika, a Konkani girl, which required her to speak a few lines in Konkani, a language she had never used before. Her next film Villali Veeran, in which she paired once again with Dileep, had her playing the role of an ad filmmaker. Her last release in 2014 was Ormayundo Ee Mukham, a romantic drama in which she was cast opposite Vineeth Sreenivasan.Her first release of 2015 was Chandrettan Evideya where she portrayed the role of Dr.Geethanjali along with Dileep and Anusree.Her performance was critically acclaimed and she went on to receive her first nomination at Filmfare Award for Best Supporting Actress.

She has acted in many commercials of Bhima Jewellers, Francis Alukkas and Ripple Tea. She has participated in reality show Ningalkkum Aakaam Kodeeshwaran on Asianet.

In 2023, Namitha established Summer Town Cafe, a vintage cafe located in Panampilly Nagar, Kochi.

Filmography

All films are in Malayalam language unless otherwise noted.

Film

Television

Awards

References

External links

 

Living people
Actresses in Malayalam cinema
Indian film actresses
People from Kottayam district
Actresses from Kerala
1996 births
21st-century Indian actresses
Indian television actresses
Actresses in Malayalam television
Actresses in Tamil cinema
Actresses in Telugu cinema
St. Teresa's College alumni